Acacia pubirhachis  is a species of wattle native to northern Queensland.

References

pubirhachis